Entre-Ijuís is a municipality of the western part of the state of Rio Grande do Sul, Brazil. The population is 8,938 (according to IBGE 2010 census) in an area of 552.60 km². It takes its name from the Ijuí Grand River, on which it is situated. It is located 435 km west of the state capital of Porto Alegre, northeast of Alegrete.

History 
Entre-Ijuís discrict is created in 1948, by Municipal Law nº 3 of August 26 of the same year.The municipality of Entre-Ijuís was created by state law nº 8558 of April 13, 1988 year upon majority votes in favor of emancipation on plebiscite held on December 20, 1987 year.

Bounding municipalities

Santo Ângelo
Catuípe
Coronel Barros
Eugênio de Castro
São Miguel das Missões
Vitória das Missões

References

External links
http://www.citybrazil.com.br/rs/entre-ijuis/ 

Municipalities in Rio Grande do Sul